Maïssade is a commune in the Hinche Arrondissement, in the Centre department of Haiti.
It has 43,138 inhabitants.

References

Populated places in Centre (department)
Communes of Haiti